Lord Ivor Charles Spencer-Churchill (14 October 1898 – 17 September 1956) was the younger son of the 9th Duke of Marlborough and his first wife, the former Consuelo Vanderbilt, an American railroad heiress. His elder brother, John, was the 10th Duke of Marlborough.

Early life
Lord Ivor Charles Spencer-Churchill was born on 14 October 1898.  He was the second son of the 9th Duke of Marlborough and Consuelo Vanderbilt.  In 1921, his parents divorced when he was 22 years old.  His father later wed the former Gladys Deacon; while his mother went on to marry Col. Jacques Balsan.

His mother was the only daughter and eldest child of William Kissam Vanderbilt, a New York railroad millionaire, and his first wife, the Mobile, Alabama born Alva Erskine Smith (1853–1933), who later married Oliver Belmont.  His mother's name was in honour of her godmother, Consuelo Yznaga (1853–1909), a half-Cuban, half-American socialite who created a social stir a year earlier when she married the fortune-hunting George, Viscount Mandeville.

Spencer-Churchill was educated at Eton College and Magdalen College, Oxford.

Career
He joined the Royal Army Service Corps in 1917, gaining the rank of lieutenant. He fought in the First World War and was decorated with the French Legion of Honour.

A conveyance dated 26 September 1930 documents the purchase of three parcels of land and premises known as Springhead situated along Mill Street at Fontmell Magna in the county of Dorset. Another conveyance dated 8 November 1934 documents Lord Ivor Churchill selling one of these parcels (31 Mill Street, a semi-detached cottage) to Henry Rolf Gardener (see Rolf Gardiner.)

Personal life
In 1923,  Lord Ivor was rumored to have become engaged to Grace Vanderbilt, a distant cousin and the daughter of Cornelius Vanderbilt III.

On 15 November 1947, he married Elizabeth "Betty" Cunningham (1914–2010), the daughter of James Cyril Cunningham.  Together, they had a son:
Robert William Charles Spencer-Churchill (born 1954), who in 1979 married Jeanne M. Maze, daughter of Etienne Maze and granddaughter of Paul Maze, a painter and friend of Winston Churchill.

Ivor developed an inoperable brain tumour and died in September 1956. He is buried beside his cousin, Sir Winston Churchill, and close to his mother at St Martin's Church, Bladon, near Woodstock, Oxfordshire.

Art collector
He was a famous art collector, especially interested by modern French painting, collecting paintings and organizing exhibitions like the Anglo-French Art & Travel Society's Exhibition of 19th Century French Painting (1–31 October 1936). He was in close relations with the English art dealer, Percy Moore Turner.

Notes

Ancestry

1898 births
1956 deaths
Royal Army Service Corps officers
British Army personnel of World War I
Ivor Spencer-Churchill
Younger sons of dukes
Vanderbilt family
Recipients of the Legion of Honour
People educated at Eton College
Alumni of Magdalen College, Oxford
Deaths from brain cancer in England
Burials at St Martin's Church, Bladon